The Fourth Kohl cabinet led by Helmut Kohl was sworn in on 18 January 1991 and laid down its function on 15 November 1994. The cabinet was formed after the 1990 elections. It laid down its function after the formation of the Cabinet Kohl V, which was formed following the 1994 elections.

This cabinet was the first to be formed after German Reunification. Among the East German politicians to enter the government was future chancellor Angela Merkel, as minister of women and health.

Composition

|}

References

Kohl
1991 establishments in Germany
1994 disestablishments in Germany
Cabinets established in 1991
Cabinets disestablished in 1994
Helmut Kohl
Kohl IV